Francis bin Fathallah bin Nasrallah Marrash (Arabic: , ; 1835, 1836, or 1837 – 1873 or 1874), also known as Francis al-Marrash or Francis Marrash al-Halabi, was a Syrian scholar, publicist, writer and poet of the Nahda or the Arab Renaissance, and a physician. Most of his works revolve around science, history and religion, analysed under an epistemological light. He traveled throughout Western Asia and France in his youth, and after some medical training and a year of practice in his native Aleppo, during which he wrote several works, he enrolled in a medical school in Paris; yet, declining health and growing blindness forced him to return to Aleppo, where he produced more literary works until his early death.

Historian Matti Moosa considered Marrash to be the first truly cosmopolitan Arab intellectual and writer of modern times. Marrash adhered to the principles of the French Revolution and defended them in his own works, implicitly criticizing Ottoman rule in Western Asia and North Africa. He was also influential in introducing French romanticism in the Arab world, especially through his use of poetic prose and prose poetry, of which his writings were the first examples in modern Arabic literature, according to Salma Khadra Jayyusi and Shmuel Moreh. His modes of thinking and feeling, and ways of expressing them, have had a lasting influence on contemporary Arab thought and on the Mahjari poets.

Life

Background and education
Francis Marrash was born in Aleppo, a city of Ottoman Syria (present-day Syria), to an old Melkite family of merchants known for their literary interests. Having earned wealth and standing in the 18th century, the family was well established in Aleppo, although they had gone through troubles: a relative of Francis, Butrus Marrash, was killed by the walis troops in the midst of a Catholic–Orthodox clash in April 1818. Other Melkite Catholics were exiled from Aleppo during the persecutions, among them the priest Jibrail Marrash. Francis' father, Fathallah, tried to defuse the sectarian conflict by writing a treatise in 1849, in which he rejected the Filioque. He had built up a large private library to give his three children Francis, Abdallah and Maryana a thorough education, particularly in the field of Arabic language and literature.

Aleppo was then a major intellectual center of the Ottoman Empire, featuring many thinkers and writers concerned with the future of the Arabs. It was in the French missionary schools that the Marrash family learnt Arabic with French and other foreign languages (Italian and English). But Francis at first studied the Arabic language and its literature privately. At the age of four years, Marrash had contracted measles, and had ever since suffered from eye problems that had kept worsening over time. Hoping to find a treatment, his father had therefore taken him to Paris in 1850; Francis stayed there for about a year, after which he was sent back to Aleppo while his father remained in Paris. In 1853, Francis accompanied his father once again, on a business trip of several months to Beirut, where there was a noticeable presence and cultural influence of Europeans. Francis experienced similar cultural contact later on, when he received private tutoring in medicine for four years under a British physician, in Aleppo—he had by then developed a keen interest in science, and in medicine in particular. At the same time, he wrote and published several works. Marrash practiced medicine for about a year; however, deeming it safer for his trade to become a state-licensed physician, he went to Paris in 1866 so as to continue his medical education at a school. But his fragile health and his growing blindness forced him to interrupt his studies within a year after his arrival. He returned to Aleppo completely blind, but still managed to dictate his works.

Literary career

Ghabat al-haqq

Around 1865, Marrash published Ghabat al-haqq ("The Forest of Truth" or "The Forest of Justice"), an allegory about the conditions required to establish and maintain civilization and freedom. This allegory relates the apocalyptic vision of a war between a Kingdom of Liberty and a Kingdom of Slavery, resolved by the capture of the latter's king and a subsequent trial before the King of Liberty, the Queen of Wisdom, the Vizier of Peace and Fraternal Love, the Commander of the Army of Civilization, with the Philosopher from the City of Light—who represents the author—as counsel. In this work, Marrash expressed ideas of political and social reforms, highlighting the need of the Arabs for two things above all: modern schools and patriotism "free from religious considerations". In 1870, when distinguishing the notion of fatherland from that of nation and applying the latter to Greater Syria, Marrash would point to the role played by language, among other factors, in counterbalancing religious and sectarian differences, and thus, in defining national identity.

Although Marrash's poetical expression lacked the legal meticulousness found in works from Enlightened Europe, orientalist Shmuel Moreh has stated that Marrash became, with Ghabat al-haqq, "the first Arab writer to reflect the optimism and humanistic view of 18th-century Europe. This view stemmed from the hope that education, science and technology would resolve such problems of humanity as slavery, religious discrimination, illiteracy, disease, poverty, war, and other scourges of mankind, and it gave utterance to his hope for brotherhood and equality among peoples." Yet, his views on freedom differed from those of the French revolutionists and of his Middle Eastern contemporaries; indeed, he considered pleading for freedom on the basis of natural analogy to be superficial, for even nature responds to its own set of rules, according to Marrash. As a consequence, nothing in the universe may yearn for liberty without satisfying essential rules and needs that guarantee its existence. Being one of these, the need for progress may therefore justify the abolition of any restriction that does not serve as a regulator for a good system. In light of this reasoning, and in reference to the ongoing American Civil War, he thus in Ghabat al-haqq supported the abolition of slavery.

But the significance of this work also lay in Marrash's attempt to blend European thought with his own reading of the Christian belief in universal love. Indeed, he had tried to reconcile his philosophical understanding of the concept of liberty with his belief in the benevolence of the Catholic Church's authority. As stated by Nazik Saba Yared: He argued that only the spiritual kingdom [i.e. the kingdom centered on religion] could curb evil [...] and consequently guarantee the freedom of man. Love is one of the pillars of Christianity, and Marrash, like some Sufis and Romantics, considered it to be the basis of civilization, indeed of the entire universe [...]. Since love, for Marrash, was the general law, and freedom meant participation in that law, it followed that freedom would be inseparable from love and religion.

Later writings

In 1867, Marrash published Rihlat Baris, an account of his second journey to Paris. The book begins with a description of his progress from Aleppo to İskenderun, Latakia, Tripoli, Beirut, Jaffa, Alexandria, Cairo, and then back to Alexandria from which he had boarded a ship to Marseille, where he arrived in October 1866. The Arab cities had inspired in him revulsion and indifference, except Alexandria and Cairo, where Ismail Pasha had already begun modernization projects. He had then travelled through France, with a stopover in Lyon before ending up in Paris. Marrash was fascinated by France, and by Paris the most; everything he described in his account, from the Paris Exhibition of 1867 to gas lighting in the streets, served to praise the accomplishments of Western civilization. In Mashhad al-ahwal ("The Witnessing of the Stages of Human Life"), published in 1870, Marrash would again compare the East and the West, writing that "while the East sank deeper into darkness, the West embraced light". The optimism he had formerly expressed about the first reform currents under the reign of Sultan Abdülaziz in the Ottoman Empire gave way to pessimism in Mashhad al-ahwal, as he realized these reforms were superficial and that those he had hoped for would not soon come into being. Yet, in Durr al-sadaf fi ghara'ib al-sudaf (Pearl Shells in Relating Strange Coincidences), which he published two years later, he depicted the Lebanese social life of his day and criticised the blind imitation of Western customs and the use of the French language in everyday life.

Throughout his life, Marrash composed many essays about science (especially mathematics), and about education, a subject which mattered a lot to him; indeed, he wrote in Ghabat al-haqq that "without the education of the mind, man is a mindless beast". He also wrote many articles in the popular press; in those published in Butrus al-Bustani's journal Al-Jinan, he showed himself favourable to women's education, which he restricted however to reading, writing, and a little bit of arithmetic, geography and grammar. In an 1872 issue of Al-Jinan, he wrote that it is not necessary for a woman "to act like a man, neglect her domestic and family duties, or that she should consider herself superior to the man"; he nonetheless closely followed his sister's studies. Marrash also condemned Arab men's severe treatment of their wives and daughters. In his later works, he tried to demonstrate the existence of God and of the divine law; the Sharia, as he conceived it, was not restricted to the sphere of the Islamic law alone.

Works

List
[[File:Mir'at al-hasna'.jpg|160px|thumbnail|right|Title page of an 1872 print of Mir'at al-hasna''']]Dalīl al-ḥurrīyah al-insānīyah (Guide to Human Liberty), 1861.Al-Mirāh al-ṣafīyah fī al-mabādi al-ṭabīīyah (The Clear Mirror of Natural Principles), 1861.Tazīyat al-makrūb wa-rāḥat al-matūb (Consolation of the Anxious and Respose of the Weary One), 1864—pessimistic discourse on nations of the past.Ghābat al-ḥaqq fī tafṣīl al-akhlāq al-fāḍilah (The Forest of Truth in Detailing Cultured Manners), c. 1865.Riḥlat Bārīs (Journey to Paris), 1867.Kitāb dalīl al-ṭabīah (Guide to Nature), c. 1867.Al-Kunūz al-fannīyah fī al-rumūz al-Maymūnīyah (Artistic Treasures Concerning the Symbolic Visions of Maymun), 1870—poem of almost 500 verses.Mashhad al-aḥwāl (The Witnessing of the Stages of Human Life), 1870—collection of poems and short works in rhymed prose.Durr al-ṣadaf fī gharāib al-ṣudaf (Pearl Shells in Relating Strange Coincidences), 1872—a romance with songs for which he supplied the tunes.Mirāt al-ḥasnā (The Mirror of the Beautiful One), 1872.Shahādat al-ṭabīah fī wujūd Allāh wa-al-sharīah (Nature's Proofs for the Existence of God and the Divine Law), 1892 (posthumous).

Writings published in periodicals:

Style

Marrash often included poems in his works, written in muwashshah and zajal forms according to the occasion. Shmuel Moreh has stated that Marrash tried to introduce "a revolution in diction, themes, metaphor and imagery in modern Arabic poetry", sometimes even mocking conventional poetic themes. In the introduction to his poetry book Mir'at al-hasna' (The Mirror of the Beautiful One), which was first published in 1872, Marrash rejected even the traditional genres of Arabic poetry, particularly panegyrics and lampoons. His use of conventional diction for new ideas marked the rise of a new stage in Arabic poetry which was carried on by the Mahjaris. Shmuel Moreh has also considered some passages from Ghabat al-haqq and Rihlat Baris'' to be prose poetry, while Salma Khadra Jayyusi has described his prosaic writing as "often Romantic in tone, rising sometimes to poetic heights, declamatory, vivid, colourful and musical", calling it the first example of poetic prose in modern Arabic literature.

Legacy

Kahlil Gibran was a great admirer of Marrash, whose works he had read at al-Hikma School in Beirut. According to Shmuel Moreh, Gibran's own works echo Marrash's style and "many of [his] ideas on enslavement, education, women's liberation, truth, the natural goodness of man, and the corrupted morals of society". Khalil Hawi has referred to Marrash's aforementioned philosophy of universal love as having left a deep impression on Gibran. Moreover, Khalil Hawi has stated that many of Marrash's recurring expressions became stock images for Arab writers of the 20th century: he has mentioned, for example, "the valleys of mental contemplation", "the wings of thoughts", "solicitudes and dreams", "the veils of history", "the Kingdom of the Spirit", "the nymphs of the forest, the spring and the dawn", "golden diadems", "the jewels of light", "the storms of days and nights", and "the smoke of revenge and the mist of anger".

Notes

References

Sources

Further reading

External links

Nahda
People from Aleppo
Syrian Melkite Greek Catholics
Syrian physicians
Syrian poets
Syrian scholars
19th-century male writers
19th-century physicians from the Ottoman Empire
19th-century scholars
1830s births
1870s deaths